The Briána (Barbus prespensis) is a species of cyprinid fish.

It is found in Albania, Greece, and North Macedonia.

Its natural habitats are intermittent rivers and freshwater lakes.
It is threatened by habitat loss.

References

Barbus
Fauna of Albania
Fauna of Greece
Cyprinid fish of Europe
Fish described in 1924
Taxa named by Stanko Karaman
Taxonomy articles created by Polbot